Su'a Saini Lemamea (14 July 1964 – January 2021) was a Samoan rugby union player. He played as a lock.

Career
Lemamea was born in Apia. His first international cap was during a match against Ireland, at Lansdowne Road, on 29 October 1989. Although he was not present in the 1991 Rugby World Cup roster, he took part at the 1995 Rugby World Cup, playing two matches. His last international cap was during a match against Tonga, at Nuku'alofa, on 8 July 1995.

References

External links
 

1964 births
2021 deaths
Sportspeople from Apia
Samoan rugby union players
Rugby union locks
Samoa international rugby union players